Francis Hammond may refer to:

Francis C. Hammond (1931–1953), U.S. Navy sailor during the Korean War and Medal of Honor recipient
, frigate named after Francis C. Hammond
Francis Hammond, Governor of Landguard Fort (1711–1719)

See also
Frank Hammond (1921–2005), author on Christian subjects